Dab in the Middle is the fourth studio album by the Serbian rock band Smak, released in 1978. The record was named after English colloquial smack dab in the middle, which means to be "In the middle of a storyline".

Track listing

Personnel 
 Boris Aranđelović - vocals
 Radomir Mihajlović "Točak" - guitar
 Tibor Levay - keyboards
 Zoran Milanović - bass
 Slobodan Stojanović "Kepa" - drums

Guest
 David Moos - Congas, Timbales, Maracas, Castanets, Gong, Cabasa

External links

Smak albums
1978 albums